Holt Creek is a stream in the U.S. state of Wisconsin. It is a tributary to the Little Wolf River. It is unknown why the name "Holt Creek" was applied to this stream.

References

Rivers of Wisconsin
Rivers of Marathon County, Wisconsin
Rivers of Portage County, Wisconsin